Volodymyr Shekhovtsov (born 3 December 1963 in Kharkiv) is a retired Ukrainian football (soccer) player and a current Ukrainian professional football coach.

On 12 September 2010, Shekovtsov was appointed for a third time as caretaker for club Helios Kharkiv in Ukrainian First League.

References

External links
 
  Interview at football.ua

1963 births
Living people
Footballers from Kharkiv
Soviet footballers
Ukrainian footballers
FC Olympik Kharkiv players
FC Oskil Kupyansk players
Ukrainian football managers
FC Oskil Kupyansk managers
FC Helios Kharkiv managers
Association football defenders
Ukrainian Amateur Football Championship players